Eutrombicula batatas is a species of chigger (trombiculid mite).

Host species include:
Didelphimorphia
Didelphis marsupialis in Venezuela
Lutreolina crassicaudata in Venezuela
Marmosa robinsoni in Venezuela
Marmosops fuscatus in Venezuela
Monodelphis brevicaudata in Venezuela
Chiroptera
Micronycteris megalotis in Venezuela
Noctilio albiventris in Venezuela
Cetartiodactyla
Odocoileus virginianus in Georgia
Lagomorpha
Sylvilagus floridanus in Venezuela
Rodentia

Holochilus sciureus in Bolivia and Venezuela

Makalata didelphoides in Bolivia
Necromys lenguarum in Bolivia
Nectomys sp. in Venezuela
Oecomys sydandersoni in Bolivia
Oligoryzomys fulvescens in Venezuela
Oligoryzomys microtis in Bolivia
Oryzomys palustris in Florida
Pattonomys semivillosus in Venezuela
Proechimys semispinosus in Venezuela
Rattus rattus in Florida and Venezuela
Sigmodon alstoni in Venezuela
Sigmodon hirsutus in Venezuela
Sigmodon sp. in Veracruz
Zygodontomys brevicauda in Panama and Venezuela
Primates
Homo sapiens

References

Literature cited
Brennan, J.M. 1970. Chiggers from the Bolivian-Brazilian border (Acarina: Trombiculidae) (subscription required). Journal of Parasitology 56:807–812.
Brennan, J.M. and Reed, J.T. 1974. The genus Eutrombicula in Venezuela (Acarina: Trombiculidae) (subscription required). Journal of Parasitology 60(4):699–711.
Carleton, M.D., Emmons, L.H. and Musser, G.G. 2009. A new species of the rodent genus Oecomys (Cricetidae: Sigmodontinae: Oryzomyini) from eastern Bolivia, with emended definitions of O. concolor (Wagner) and O. mamorae (Thomas). American Museum Novitates 3661:1–32.
Estébanes-González, M.L. and Cervantes, F.A. 2005. Mites and ticks associated with some small mammals in Mexico (subscription required). International Journal of Acarology 31(1):23–37.
Voss, R.S. 1991. An introduction to the neotropical muroid rodent genus Zygodontomys. Bulletin of the American Museum of Natural History 210:1–113.
Wilson, N. and Durden, L.A. 2003. Ectoparasites of terrestrial vertebrates inhabiting the Georgia Barrier Islands, USA: an inventory and preliminary biogeographical analysis (subscription required). Journal of Biogeography 30(8):1207–1220.
Worth, C.B. 1950. Observations on ectoparasites of some small mammals in Everglades National Park and Hillsborough County, Florida (subscription required). The Journal of Parasitology 36(4):326–335.

Trombiculidae
Animals described in 1758
Arachnids of North America
Arachnids of South America
Taxa named by Carl Linnaeus